Tornado bomber may refer to 

North American B-45 Tornado, a first generation jet bomber aircraft
Panavia Tornado, a 1970s multi-role aircraft which in the IDS variant is used as an interdictor